The 2011–12 SIJHL season is the 11th season of the Superior International Junior Hockey League (SIJHL). The seven teams of the SIJHL will play 56-game schedules.

Come February, the top teams of the league will play down for the Bill Salonen Cup, the SIJHL championship.  The winner of the Bill Salonen Cup will compete in the Central Canadian Junior "A" championship, the Dudley Hewitt Cup.  If successful against the winners of the Ontario Junior Hockey League and Northern Ontario Junior Hockey League, the champion would then move on to play in the Canadian Junior Hockey League championship, the 2012 Royal Bank Cup.

Changes
Iron Range Ironheads of Chisholm, Minnesota join league.

Current standings
Note: GP = Games played; W = Wins; L = Losses; OTL = Overtime losses; SL = Shootout losses; GF = Goals for; GA = Goals against; PTS = Points; x = clinched playoff berth; y = clinched division title; z = clinched conference title

Teams listed on the official league website.

Standings listed on official league website.

2011-12 Bill Salonen Cup Playoffs

Playoff results are listed on the official league website.

Survivor Series
Winner plays 3rd seed in Quarter-final.Best-of-Three.

Super Series
Winner gets choice of opponent in semi-finals. A team gets a point for winning the first two-game-aggregate in games one and two, and another point for games three and four.  If tied 1-1 after four games, the series goes to sudden death shootout.

Dudley Hewitt Cup Championship
Hosted by the Thunder Bay North Stars in Thunder Bay, Ontario.  The North Stars finished third in the round robin and lost the semi-final to finish third overall.  The Wisconsin Wilderness finished fourth in the round robin and failed to make the playoff rounds.

Round Robin
Soo Thunderbirds (NOJHL) 4 - Wisconsin Wilderness 3 in overtime
Stouffville Spirit (OJHL) 2 - Thunder Bay North Stars 1 in overtime
Wisconsin Wilderness 5 - Stouffville Spirit (OJHL) 2
Soo Thunderbirds (NOJHL) 4 - Thunder Bay North Stars 3
Thunder Bay North Stars 4 - Wisconsin Wilderness 3 in overtime
Semi-final
Soo Thunderbirds (NOJHL) 8 - Thunder Bay North Stars 5

Scoring leaders
Note: GP = Games played; G = Goals; A = Assists; Pts = Points; PIM = Penalty minutes

Leading goaltenders
Note: GP = Games played; Mins = Minutes played; W = Wins; L = Losses: OTL = Overtime losses; SL = Shootout losses; GA = Goals Allowed; SO = Shutouts; GAA = Goals against average

Awards
Player of the Year: Byron Katapaytuk (Fort Frances Lakers)
Coach of the Year: Rod Aldoff (Wisconsin Wilderness)
Top Goaltender: Tanner Milliron (Wisconsin Wilderness)
Top Defensive Forward: Sam Dubinsky (Thunder Bay North Stars)
Rookie of the Year: Jordan Larson (Fort Frances Lakers)
Top Defenceman: Anthony Calabrese (Wisconsin Wilderness)
Most Improved Player: Matt Morsette (Duluth Clydesdales)
Most Sportsmanlike Player: Dane Morin (Sioux Lookout Flyers)
Top Scorer: Byron Katapaytuk (Fort Frances Lakers)
Playoff MVP: Jeremy Johnson (Wisconsin Wilderness)

See also
 2012 Royal Bank Cup
 Dudley Hewitt Cup
 Ontario Junior Hockey League
 Northern Ontario Junior Hockey League
 Greater Ontario Junior Hockey League
 2011 in ice hockey
 2012 in ice hockey

References

External links
 Official website of the Superior International Junior Hockey League
 Official website of the Canadian Junior Hockey League

Superior International Junior Hockey League seasons
SIJHL